Tipasa, distinguished as Tipasa in Numidia, was a town in the Roman province of Numidia in North Africa.

History 

Tipasa was a Carthaginian trading post under the name . It was connected with the port Hippo Regius by a road; they struck their coins in common.

It was taken over by the Roman Republic at some point after the Punic Wars.

Ruins 

References

Citations

Bibliography
 .

Phoenician colonies in Algeria